Freedom of Choice, or Free transfer plan, was the name for a number of plans developed in the United States during 1965–1970, aimed at the integration of schools in states that had a segregated educational system.

Background 
Ten years after the US Supreme Court ruled in Brown II (1955) for school racial integration with "all deliberate speed," many school districts in states with school segregation gave their students the right to choose between white and black schools, independently of their race. In practice, most schools remained segregated, with only a small minority of black students choosing to attend a white school and no white student choosing black schools.

Challenge 
In 1968, three cases were argued before the US Supreme Court on the inadequacy of Freedom of Choice plans. The Supreme Court ruled that if Freedom of Choice, by itself, was not sufficient to achieve integration, as it was in the cases argued, other means had to be used, such as zoning, to achieve the goal. The ruling and its consequences raised strong opposition in many school districts in which that kind of plan had been applied. By the early 1970s, none of the plans remained in effect.

See also
 Alexander v. Holmes County Board of Education

Notes

References 

Civil rights movement
School segregation in the United States